Egon Hirt (born 16 August 1960 in Freiburg im Breisgau) is a German former alpine skier who competed in the 1984 Winter Olympics.

External links
 sports-reference.com

1960 births
Living people
German male alpine skiers
Olympic alpine skiers of West Germany
Alpine skiers at the 1984 Winter Olympics
Sportspeople from Freiburg im Breisgau
20th-century German people